The American International School of Medicine (AISM) is a private medical school with its main campus in Georgetown, Guyana and clinical campuses in Atlanta Georgia, clinical placements in United Kingdom, and training sites in Nigeria. Graduates obtain a Medical Doctorate upon successful completion of the four or five years of didactic education and training candidates earn the doctor of medicine degree to successfully exit the medical program.

The AISM is chartered in and is recognized by the government of Guyana. AISM is registered with the National Accreditation Council of Guyana. The university is listed in the AVICENNA directory of medicine and the FAIMER International Medical Education Directory (IMED) and World Health Organization.

History 
AISM was established in 1999 by International Medical Educators Associates, Inc. (IMEA) in Atlanta, Georgia, USA, headed by Dr. Colin A. Wilkinson. The establishment of AISM in Guyana was approved by the Cabinet of the Government of Guyana on October 19, 1999. The first batch of students was admitted in January 2000. Since then, AISM has graduated hundreds of  physicians, researchers, academicians, and medical education administrators who are working in Guyana, U.K., USA, Antigua and Barbuda, Grenada, Nigeria, India, Trinidad, Pakistan, Tanzania and other countries.

In 2012, AISM collaborated with the Civil Defence Commission and the Cheddi Jagan International Airport trained 18 airport staff members to be certified as first responders.

Medical Program 
AISM has a four-year doctor of medicine (MD) Program. It consists of 5 semesters of basic sciences and 6 semesters of clinical sciences. The basic sciences program is taught at the Georgetown, Guyana campus and the clinical sciences program is completed in Guyana, the US, and/or the UK.

After completing the basic sciences program, students take the USMLE Step 1 examination. Upon completion of the program, students take the USMLE step 2 examination and/or if applicable the PLAB.

AISM graduates are eligible to take the medical council of India (MCI) approved for interning into clinical practice in India examination(s) to be able to complete post graduate training and practicing in India. 
Many AISM graduates are invited and has accepted residency training positions in Guyana, USA, UK, Caricom countries, Nigeria, to name a few jurisdictions.

Tuition
The tuition cost for the MD program as of January 2017 was:

 Basic Sciences per semester: US$7,500
 Clinical Sciences per semester: US$8,500

References 

Higher education in Guyana

Medical schools in the Caribbean
Medical schools in Guyana